Taylor Michael Caniff (born February 3, 1996) is an American Internet personality, known for his appearances on YouTube and the video application Vine. Caniff later went on to appear in the Netflix reality series Chasing Cameron.

Career
Caniff launched a YouTube channel in September 2012. He posted six second clips of pranks, comedy sketches and videos about his life on Vine in 2013. He later joined the Magcon (Meet and Greet Convention) touring group with Nash Grier, Cameron Dallas, Matthew Espinosa, Shawn Mendes, Aaron Carpenter, Carter Reynolds, Dj Mahogany Lox, Jacob Whitesides, Hayes Grier,  Dylan Collins  and Jack & Jack. In 2013-2014 the group toured the United States holding conventions where fans could meet and interact with the internet celebrities. The original Magcon group broke up after the tour ended in 2014. Caniff then traveled the United States with the DigiTour. In 2015 he embarked on his first solo tour, the RV Project Tour. In 2016 he went on parts of a world tour with a re-boot of Magcon, which included Aaron Carpenter, Cameron Dallas, Dylan Dauzat, Jacob Sartorius and other internet celebrities. That same year, Caniff co-starred in the Netflix reality series Chasing Cameron about the tour. He's done several tours throughout 2017.

Music
In 2014 Caniff formed a hip hop duo with Dillon Rupp named 2Virgins. On April 5 of that year the group released their debut single "Buckwild". Later in the year, the group released their second single "Like Whoo". In 2016 he released "Cash On Me" with Trey Schafer, about people who use celebrities and only want them for money and fame. He released others throughout the year.

Filmography

Discography

2Virgins

Awards and nominations

References

External links

1996 births
American YouTubers
Living people
People from Princeton, Indiana
Vine (service) celebrities